Justin Patrick Herbert (born March 10, 1998) is an American football quarterback for the Los Angeles Chargers of the National Football League (NFL). He played college football at Oregon, where he won the 2019 Pac-12 Championship and was named MVP of the 2020 Rose Bowl. Herbert was selected by the Chargers as the sixth overall pick in the 2020 NFL Draft.

Herbert became the Chargers starting quarterback in the second game of his rookie year. Herbert remained as the starter for the rest of the season. He set several rookie statistical records, including the most touchdown passes and the most 300-yard games. Herbert was named the AP NFL Offensive Rookie of the Year.

Early life
Herbert was born in Eugene, Oregon, on March 10, 1998, and attended Sheldon High School, where he played football, basketball, and baseball. Justin co-founded the Sheldon High School Fishing Club while in high school.  He suffered a broken leg in the third football game of his junior season, complicating his recruitment process. As a senior, he passed for 3,130 yards and 37 touchdowns, and rushed for 543 yards and 10 touchdowns. He was named 1st Team All-State and the Southwest Conference Offensive Player of the Year. Northern Arizona, Portland State, and Montana State extended offers before Nevada and Oregon followed up with his only FBS offers. Herbert committed to Oregon in October 2015.

College career

2016 season 
Entering his true freshman season listed as QB2 on the depth chart behind Dakota Prukop, Herbert became the first true freshman at Oregon to start at Quarterback since Chris Miller in 1983 when the Ducks took on arch-rivals Washington on October 8, 2016. Despite Herbert setting or equaling Oregon's single-game records for total offensive yards (512), passing yards (489), and touchdown passes (6), the Ducks finished with their worst season in 25 years, going 4–8 and failing to make a bowl game for the first time in over a decade.

Herbert became the starting quarterback after the fifth game of the season and showcased his talents throwing for 1,936 yards including 19 touchdowns with just four interceptions in eight starts. He led a come-from-behind upset when playing the ranked No. 11 Utah Utes. The team scored four touchdowns in the final 15:27 of the game to overcome a 14–3 deficit. On the final drive, Herbert completed 6-of-9 passes for 63 yards, including a 17-yard game-winning touchdown pass with two seconds left.

2017 season 
The Ducks entered the 2017 season with new head coach Willie Taggart. Leading the Ducks to a 4–1 start, Herbert's transition from the Chip Kelly/Mark Helfrich-era's “Blur Offense” to Taggart's “Gulf Coast Offense” was successful before he fractured his collarbone against Cal on September 30, 2017.

Without Herbert in the lineup, the Ducks dropped four of their next five games, and the offense went from averaging 49.2 points per game to just 15.0 points per game. Herbert returned to help the Ducks win their last two regular season games to become bowl eligible. The Ducks were selected to play Boise State in the Las Vegas Bowl but their performance fell flat and the Ducks lost 38–28 after head coach Willie Taggart left the team to become the head coach at Florida State a week before their bowl game.

In eight starts, Herbert had a 6–2 record and threw for 1,983 yards on 139-of-206 passing attempts (67.5%), including 15 touchdowns against only five interceptions. He also rushed the ball 44 times for 183 yards and five touchdowns. Herbert was named first-team CoSIDA Academic All-American with a 4.08 grade-point average in biology.

2018 season 

Herbert entered his third collegiate season as an early Heisman Trophy candidate despite being coached by a third different head coach. He also learned a third different offensive scheme with new head coach Mario Cristobal, transitioning from the spread offense to the pistol offense. Herbert led the Ducks to a 9–4 record and a victory in the Redbox Bowl. He finished the year with 3,151 passing yards, 29 passing touchdowns, and two rushing touchdowns. His 31 total touchdowns were good for second in the Pac-12 Conference behind Washington State's Gardner Minshew. He was named to the Pac-12 All-Academic first-team.

2019 season 
Despite projecting as a high draft pick, Herbert announced that he would return to Oregon for his senior season. He led the Ducks to a 12–2 record, including a win in the Rose Bowl where he ran for three touchdowns and was named Offensive MVP.  In his best statistical collegiate season, Herbert totaled 3,471 passing yards, 32 passing touchdowns, and four rushing touchdowns. In addition to his on-field success, Herbert was named the 30th recipient of the William V. Campbell Trophy, also referred to as the "Academic Heisman".

Statistics

Awards and honors

2016
 Pac-12 Offensive Player of the Week (Pac-12 Coaches) – October 31, 2016 
 Manning Award Quarterback of the Week – November 3, 2016 
 Len Casanova Award (Oregon Team Award – Best First Year Player)

2017
 Pac-12 Academic All-Conference 1st Team 
 Academic All American 1st Team 
 Offensive Team MVP (Oregon Team Award)

2018
 Google Cloud Academic All America 1st Team Member of the Year 
 Pac-12 All-Academic 1st team
 Skeie's Award (Oregon Team Award – Most Valuable Player)

2019
 Academic All American 1st Team
 Pac-12 Offensive Player of the Week (Pac-12 Coaches) – October 21, 2019 
 William V. Campbell Trophy
2020 Rose Bowl Offensive MVP

Professional career

Herbert was selected sixth overall by the Los Angeles Chargers in the first round of the 2020 NFL Draft. He was the third quarterback taken, behind Joe Burrow and Tua Tagovailoa. On July 25, 2020, Herbert signed his four-year rookie contract, worth a fully guaranteed $26.6 million.

2020

Herbert's jersey was listed as the 12th best selling jersey to start the season. Herbert was named the backup quarterback behind starter Tyrod Taylor ahead of Week 1.

On September 20, 2020, Herbert made his first NFL start in Week 2 against the Kansas City Chiefs, replacing Taylor, who was ruled inactive after the team's doctor accidentally punctured his lung. He finished with 311 passing yards, one touchdown, one interception, and one rushing score as the Chargers lost 23–20 in overtime. He became only the third player in NFL history to pass for at least 300 yards and rush for a touchdown in his first career game. During Week 4 against the Tampa Bay Buccaneers, Herbert completed 20 passes out of 25 attempts for 290 yards, three touchdowns, and an interception as the Chargers lost 38–31. On October 8, 2020, Herbert was named the starting quarterback for the Chargers over Tyrod Taylor going forward.

In Week 5 against the New Orleans Saints on Monday Night Football, Herbert threw for 264 yards and four touchdowns during the 30–27 overtime loss. He became the first rookie in NFL history to throw for four touchdown passes on Monday Night Football. Herbert was named Offensive Rookie of the Month after throwing 10 touchdowns to one interception in three starts with 901 passing yards and a 122.2 passer rating. He also became the first rookie quarterback in NFL history with multiple touchdowns in seven consecutive games.
Herbert was named the Offensive Rookie of the Month for his performance in November.

On December 27, 2020, Herbert threw his 28th passing touchdown of the season against the Denver Broncos, breaking the NFL record for most passing touchdowns by a rookie (previously held by Baker Mayfield) during the 19–16 win. During the game, he also reached 4,000 yards passing for the season, becoming only the fourth rookie quarterback to achieve the feat. He was named Rookie of the Year and Offensive Rookie of the Year by the Pro Football Writers of America. Herbert finished the 2020 season on a four-game winning streak with 4,336 yards passing, 31 touchdowns, and 10 interceptions. He was named to the NFL All-Rookie Team. He was ranked 56th by his fellow players on the NFL Top 100 Players of 2021.

2021

Herbert helped lead the Chargers to a 3–1 start, including a 30–24 victory over the Kansas City Chiefs. In Week 5, against the Cleveland Browns, Herbert had his best statistical game of the season. He had 398 passing yards, four passing touchdowns, and a rushing touchdown in a 47–42 shootout victory. In Week 9, Herbert had three total touchdowns while completing 32-of-38 passes for 356 yards, two touchdowns, a rushing touchdown, and no interceptions in a 27–24 win over the Philadelphia Eagles, earning AFC Offensive Player of the Week. Against the Pittsburgh Steelers on Week 11, Herbert had 382 yards on air, three touchdowns, and an interception in a 41–37 win.

In Week 13, playing against the Cincinnati Bengals, Herbert had 317 passing yards, three passing touchdowns, and an interception in a 41–22 victory, earning him his second AFC Offensive Player of the Week berth of the season. He followed that performance with 275 passing yards, three passing touchdowns, and no interceptions in Week 14 against the New York Giants, lifting the Chargers to a comfortable 37–21 victory, and an 8–5 record. He earned his second consecutive, and third overall, AFC Offensive Player of the Week honor for his performance.

In Week 15, playing against the Kansas City Chiefs, Herbert surpassed Andrew Luck's record for the most passing yards in an NFL quarterback's first two seasons. Additionally, he surpassed Dan Marino's record for the most total touchdowns in an NFL quarterback's first two seasons. In a Week 18 win or tie or go home situation against the Las Vegas Raiders, Herbert threw for 383 yards, three touchdowns, and an interception in the 35–32 overtime loss, eliminating the Chargers from the playoffs.

In the 2021 season, Herbert recorded franchise records with 5,014 passing yards, 38 passing touchdowns, and 15 interceptions. In addition, he had 63 carries for 302 rushing yards and three rushing touchdowns, leading the Chargers to a 9–8 record and his first career Pro Bowl. Herbert became the first quarterback in franchise history to throw for at least 5,000 yards in a single season. He was ranked 40th by his fellow players on the NFL Top 100 Players of 2022.

2022

In Week 1 against the Las Vegas Raiders, Herbert threw for 279 yards and three touchdowns in the 24–19 win. In Week 2 against the Kansas City Chiefs, Herbert threw for 334 yards and three touchdowns for the second consecutive game. In the fourth quarter, Herbert suffered a fracture to his rib cartilage. Despite a late touchdown, the Chargers would go on to lose 27–24. This was also Herbert's first season in which he made the playoffs with his team.

NFL career statistics

Regular season

Postseason

Records and achievements

NFL records
 Most passing touchdowns by a rookie quarterback (31)
 Most total touchdowns by a rookie quarterback (36)
 Most 300-yard passing games by a rookie quarterback (8)
 Most completions by a rookie quarterback (396)
 Most games with at least 3 touchdown passes by a rookie (6)
 Most passing yards in a quarterback's first two seasons (9,350)
 Most total touchdowns in a quarterback's first two seasons (77)
 First quarterback to record 30 touchdown passes in each of his first two seasons
 Most passing yards in a quarterback's first three NFL seasons (14,089)
 Most completions in first 50 NFL games: (1,316)
 Most pass attempts per game, career: (40.1)

Personal life 
Herbert's grandfather, Rich Schwab, played receiver at the University of Oregon in the 1960s. His father, Mark Herbert, played football and ran track at the University of Montana. Herbert was a San Diego Chargers fan growing up. He graduated from Oregon with a bachelor's degree in general science. In 2019, Herbert was awarded William V. Campbell Trophy, which recognizes excellence in academics, athletics, and leadership. Herbert's younger brother, Patrick, also attends Oregon as a tight end for the Ducks. His older brother, Mitchell, played wide receiver at Montana State University.

References

External links

Los Angeles Chargers bio
Oregon Ducks bio

1998 births
Living people
American Conference Pro Bowl players
American football quarterbacks
Los Angeles Chargers players
National Football League Offensive Rookie of the Year Award winners
Oregon Ducks football players
Players of American football from Oregon
Sheldon High School (Eugene, Oregon) alumni
Sportspeople from Eugene, Oregon